Propane-1,2,3-tricarboxylic acid, also known as tricarballylic acid, carballylic acid, and β-carboxyglutaric acid, is a tricarboxylic acid. The compound is an inhibitor of the enzyme aconitase and therefore interferes with the Krebs cycle. 

Esters of propane-1,2,3-tricarboxylic acid are found in natural products such as the mycotoxins fumonisins B1 and B2 and AAL toxin TA, and in macrocyclic inhibitors of Ras farnesyl-protein transferase (FPTase) such as actinoplanic acid.

Propane-1,2,3-tricarboxylic acid can be synthesized in two steps from fumaric acid.

Mechanism of the inhibition of aconitase 

Aconitase normally catalyses, via the intermediate aconitic acid, the interconversion of citric acid into isocitric acid. Propane-1,2,3-tricarboxylic acid is well suited to bind to aconitase as it only lacks the hydroxide group in comparison to citric acid. However, the hydroxide group is essential to proceed from citric acid to aconitic acid, therefore the enzyme is not able to complete the reaction with propane-1,2,3-tricarboxylic acid.

References 

Tricarboxylic acids
Aconitase inhibitors